Pir Sultan Abdal (born Haydar, 1480 A.D./884 A.H. in Yıldızeli, died 1550 A.D./956 A.H.), is an important religious figure in Alevism, who is thought to be of Turkoman origin and to have been born in the village of Banaz, itself in the town of Yildizeli, in the present-day Sivas Province, Turkey. He is considered legendary among his followers. His life is reconstructed from folkloric sources, especially religious poems which are believed to have been composed by himself and transmitted by ashiks. However, his attribution is considered problematic. 

During the Ottoman–Persian Wars, he supported religious heterodoxy and the political subversion of Anatolia which got him hanged.

See also 
 Alevism
 Kurdish Alevism

References 

Executed people from the Ottoman Empire
People executed by the Ottoman Empire by hanging
Turkish-language poets